Femi Elufowoju jr  (born 31 October 1962) is a Nigerian theatre and opera director. After Alton Kumalo's Temba Theatre Company, he is the second theatre director of African descent to establish a national touring company in the UK (Tiata Fahodzi, 1997). Elufowoju's stage work has been seen across most key flagship theatres in the UK, and has collaborated extensively with notable creatives within the film, television and radio sectors.

Early life and education 
Elufowoju jr was born Elugbaju Oluyinka Oluwafemi on 31 October 1962 in Hammersmith, London, to Nigerian parents from Ile-Ife. He attended Copenhagen Primary & Junior School, Islington, from 1967 to 1974, before moving to Nigeria. He attended Sacred Heart Primary School, Ring Road, Ibadan, in 1975, and Christ's School, Ado Ekiti (1975–80), before going to the Oyo State College of Arts and Science in 1980.

He read Law at the University of Ife (now Obafemi Awolowo University) but was advised to withdraw in 1985 just before returning to the UK. He attended North London College, where he received a Certificate in Community Theatre. In 1990, he obtained a bachelor's degree in Dramatic Arts from Bretton Hall, Leeds University's affiliated drama training institute. Between 2010 and 2012, Elufowoju took a career break to attend South Bank University and concentrate on a postgraduate degree in Education.

Theatre 
In the summer of 1995, Mehmet Ergen invited Elufowoju to headline a season of African plays at the Southwark Playhouse. The play that later turned out to be the young director's debut production was Mauritian author San Cassimally's Acquisitive Case. The production led to Elufowoju winning a Regional Theatre Young Director bursary from Channel 4 and the Cameron Mackintosh Foundation to train as a theatre director under Philip Hedley at the Theatre Royal Stratford East. The following year, after a ground-breaking tour of Sweden with his second production (and first written play) Tickets and Ties: The African Tale, billed as "the biggest and most ambitious West African show", Elufowoju established Tiata Fahodzi, a national touring theatre company, its core mission statement being to demonstrate the African experience on the British stage. He artistically led the company for 13 years, directing and presenting more than 30 plays, including his productions of Ola Rotimi's The Gods Are Not to Blame and Oladipo Agboluaje's Iya-Ile: The First Wife  (nominated for the Olivier Award). During the same period, Elufowoju served as an Associate directing plays at the Almeida Theatre, Royal Court Theatre, West Yorkshire Playhouse, and the New Wolsey Theatre in Ipswich.

In 2016, he directed Bonnie Greer's The Hotel Cerise, as well as the British premiere of Blues for an Alabama Sky by American playwright Pearl Cleage at the Royal Academy of Dramatic Art.

In 2019, he directed Bim Adewunmi's Hoard, written for BBC Arts and Avalon as part of an initiative to encourage writers from genres outside of theatre to write for the stage.

Elufowoju's interpretation of The Glass Menagerie by Tennessee Williams, described as a "radical new reimagining", was produced in May 2019 for Watford Palace Theatre and Arcola Theatre.

For Fuel Theatre, Elufowoju directed Inua Ellams' adaptation of Antoine de Saint-Exupéry's The Little Prince in the spring of 2020.  It previewed in London, Manchester and Coventry before the first pandemic lockdown.

As part of Manchester's Halle Orchestra 2021 spring season, Sir Mark Elder invited Annabel Arden and Elufowoju to direct a staged performance of Stravinsky's 1918 masterpiece The Soldier's Tale, read, played, and danced by three actors, a dancer and seven instrumentalists. The film marked Elufowoju's debut as a film director.

Radio 
In 2010, he commenced a freelance career, producing and directing several dramas for BBC Radio 3 and BBC Radio 4, including Rex Obano's Burned to Nothing, Sam Soko's The New Bwana, Chinonyeram Odimba's Eve and the seminal Stages of Independence for BBC World Service, a celebration of 50 years of African drama throwing a spotlight on 50 years of Africa's Independence. In 2021, Elufowoju returned to the BBC to direct Rex Obano's City College for Radio 3 and in 2022 directed Diran Adebayo's radio serialization of his 1997 debut novel, Some Kind of Black.

Film 
 Mechanic: Resurrection (2016), as Krill

Opera 
In January 2022, Elufowoju made his opera debut as a director with Giuseppe Verdi's Rigoletto, for Opera North in Leeds. The production, which featured Eric Greene, Roman Arndt, Jasmine Habersham, and Sir Willard White, garnered five-star reviews including The Daily Telegraph hailing Elufowoju's production as "a bold and innovative staging that will still be talked about 16 years from now". The Guardians four-star review spoke of Elufowoju's debut as being "so powerful and so current and at the same time so true to the artistic force of Verdi's setting of Victor Hugo that it is somehow surprising that it has taken until now for someone to put it on the stage."

Elufowoju's second opera (updated with a new German libretto) is the 1780 French opera Der Anonyme Liebhaber (The Anonymous Lover), the story based on the life and music of relatively unknown 18th-century classical composer Joseph Bologne, Chevalier de Saint-Georges. The new production is for Konzert und Theater St Gallen in Switzerland, and has its European premiere in September 2022.

The Elufowoju Jr Ensemble 
In 2015, Thomas Kell and Elufowoju set up The Elufowoju jr Ensemble with a view to creating exceptional world-class African theatre with imaginative flair for the international stage.

Elufowoju in the summer of 2018 directed a stage adaptation of Lola Shoneyin's The Secret Lives of Baba Segi's Wives in a full co-production with the Arcola Theatre. It won him the Best Director Award (Offie 2019) for an Off West-End Production. The production was noted for being the highest grossing box-office show in the entire 20-year history of the Arcola. In the same year, the production returned to Nigeria under the aegis of Sourmash Stories Productions (Teniola Olatoni Ojigbede producing) as the theatre segment for the Ake Festival 2018. The BBC subsequently commissioned Elufowoju to adapt a new dramatization for Radio 3, which was broadcast in November 2019.

54.60 Africa 
In 2013, Elufowoju embarked on a mission of a lifetime: to visit all 54 countries in Africa. The project, titled 54.60 Africa, culminates in October 2022. The ambition is for Elufowoju under the aegis of his new theatre company, to publish a book and playtext chronicling his pan-African odyssey. In February, May and October 2021, with funding from Arts Council England, preliminary theatre workshops and presentations exploring potentials for a future theatre production took place at the Hackney Showroom, Bernie Grant Arts Centre and Omnibus Theatre.

Performance 
Elufowoju's notable television appearances include in the BBC comedy series Little Miss Jocelyn as Mr Omwokpopopo, serial dramas Moses Jones, Wire in the Blood, Borgen, Enterprice, Year of the Rabbit, Silent Witness, and the first two seasons of Sex Education. His film credits include The Legend of 1900, Mechanic: Resurrection, The Saint and The Princess Switch 3 with Vanessa Hudgens.

Affiliated work in the arts 
In 2003, Elufowoju was appointed Segment Director facilitating the Commonwealth Parade (The Mall Pageant) on the occasion of the Golden Jubilee Celebrations of Her Majesty Queen Elizabeth II. In 2019, Clarence House on behalf of the Duchess of Cornwall invited Elufowoju to be one of the Final Panel Judges for The Queen's 2019 Commonwealth Essay Competition. He reprised this role again in 2021.

Nigeria 
Elufowoju has spent periods returning to his ancestral home Nigeria, building alliances with notable creative cultural leaders including Governor Kayode Fayemi, Lola Shoneyin Akin Adejuwon, Efe Paul Azino, and theatre impresarios Bolanle Austen Peters and Teniola Olatoni Ojigbede.

Awards and nominations

References 

1962 births
Living people
20th-century Nigerian male actors
Alumni of Bretton Hall College
Alumni of London South Bank University
Alumni of the University of Leeds
Black British male actors
English people of Nigerian descent
English people of Yoruba descent
English theatre directors
Male actors from London
Nigerian male actors
Nigerian theatre directors
Obafemi Awolowo University alumni
Yoruba male actors
People from Hammersmith